Christopher Pellini (born February 10, 1984 in Mississauga, Ontario) is a Canadian sprint kayaker. He won a silver medal at the 2007 Pan American Games in the men's K-4 1,000 metres event, alongside Angus Mortimer, Jeremy Bordeleau and Mark de Jonge.

He also competed at the 2008 Summer Olympics in Beijing, finishing ninth in the K-4 1000 m event.

References
Canadian Olympic Committee
{ Sports-Reference.com profile]

1984 births
Canadian male canoeists
Canoeists at the 2007 Pan American Games
Canoeists at the 2008 Summer Olympics
Living people
McMaster University alumni
Olympic canoeists of Canada
Sportspeople from Mississauga
Pan American Games silver medalists for Canada
Pan American Games medalists in canoeing
Medalists at the 2007 Pan American Games